Bay Freeway was the name of two cancelled freeway projects in the United States, neither of which was ever built:
 The Bay Freeway (Milwaukee)	
 The Bay Freeway (Seattle)